Brandt's hedgehog (Paraechinus hypomelas) is a species of desert hedgehog native to parts of the Middle East and Central Asia. Its common name derives from its having first been described by Johann Friedrich von Brandt, a director of the Zoological Department at the St Petersburg Academy of Sciences.

Description
Brandt's hedgehog is approximately the size of the West European hedgehog (about 500–1,000 g in weight and 25 cm in length), but has distinctively large ears (similar to the long-eared hedgehog), and is a much faster runner, due to lighter needle protection. Unlike the long-eared hedgehog, however, it is predominantly nocturnal.

The first and only study of the Brandt's hedgehog histological skin characteristics found three layers of skin the epidermis, dermis and hypodermis; while previous studies of other hedgehogs sited only two.

Habitat
Brandt's hedgehog prefers arid desert areas and mountains. It often uses natural shelter, although it is still capable of digging dens when absolutely needed. It hibernates during colder weather.

Subspecies
There are multiple subspecies of Brandt's hedgehog: 
Paraechinus hypomelas blanfordi
Paraechinus hypomelas hypomelas 
Paraechinus hypomelas niger
Paraechinus hypomelas seniculus

References 

Brandt's hedgehog
Mammals of Western Asia
Mammals of Afghanistan
Mammals of the Arabian Peninsula
Fauna of Iran
Brandt's hedgehog